Haplochromis venator is a species of cichlid endemic to Lake Nabugabo in Uganda.  This species reaches a length of  SL.

References

venator
Fish described in 1965
Endemic freshwater fish of Uganda
Lake fish of Africa
Taxonomy articles created by Polbot